Rome Wasn't Built in a Day may refer to:

 Rome wasn't built in a day, an epigram
 Rome Wasn't Built in a Day (TV series), a historical recreation
 Rome Wasn't Built in a Day (song), a 2000 pop song by Morcheeba
 A 1962 soul song by Johnnie Taylor